Timothy James Kazurinsky (born March 3, 1950) is an American actor and screenwriter best known as a cast member and writer on Saturday Night Live and for his role as Carl Sweetchuck in the Police Academy films.

Early life
Kazurinsky was born in Johnstown, Pennsylvania. His father, who was American-born, was of Polish descent, and his mother was an Australian war bride. He spent most of his childhood in Australia, where he attended Birrong Boys High School. When he was 16, he moved to America by himself. He completed his education, graduating from Greater Johnstown High School in 1967.

Kazurinsky worked as a reporter for the Johnstown Tribune-Democrat, then as a copywriter for a St. Louis, Missouri, department store. He moved to Chicago and began working for Leo Burnett Worldwide in its advertising department. Seeking to gain confidence presenting ad pitches, Kazurinsky enrolled in an improv class at The Second City, where he became a member of the mainstage troupe in 1978, refining his improvisation and acting chops under the tutelage of Del Close. Eventually, Kazurinsky caught the attention of Saturday Night Live luminary John Belushi who recommended him to the show's then-executive producer, Dick Ebersol. Ebersol was impressed with Kazurinsky and hired him as a writer and cast member in 1981.

Saturday Night Live
During his three seasons on SNL, Kazurinsky was known for playing numerous characters as well as doing celebrity impersonations. Fellow cast members included Eddie Murphy, Joe Piscopo, Julia Louis-Dreyfus and Mary Gross. Kazurinsky was part of the show's 1984 writing team nominated for a Primetime Emmy Award for Outstanding Writing in a Variety or Music Program. There were reports that he often clashed with Dick Ebersol regarding the show's creative direction. In 1984, Kazurinsky left SNL along with Piscopo.

Recurring characters on SNL
 Dr. Jack Badofsky, supposed science editor of Weekend Update, who presented absurd lists of humorous pun-based disease names. Jon Stewart referenced the character in a 2011 Daily Show segment lampooning Herman Cain. The character was again alluded to in a 2016 episode of The Simpsons when Mr. Burns exclaims, "Wordplay is for crosswords and Kazurinskys!"
 Mr. Landlord from "Mr. Robinson's Neighborhood" with Eddie Murphy
 Father Timothy Owens, an Irish priest
 The Iguana, the male half of a hopelessly dorky couple who never revealed to his wife that he was a dangerous adventurer
 Havnagootiim Vishnuuerheer (pronounced "Having a good time wish you were here"), a Hindu "Enlightened Master" who cleared up "The Great Unanswered Questions of the Universe"
 Wayne Huevos, a suave Latin-American businessman who appeared on Weekend Update with ideas on how to clean up New York City
 Worthington Clotman, SNL's resident network censor, based on real-life network censor Bill Clotworthy, who would interrupt sketches and point out objectionable material
 Madge The Chimp's Husband in the recurring soap opera drama "I Married a Monkey"

Celebrity impressions on SNL
Mahatma Gandhi (in a movie trailer parody called "Gandhi and the Bandit")
Billie Jean King
Adolf Hitler
Ozzy Osbourne
Klaus Barbie
Gary Hart
Moe Howard
Douglas MacArthur
Deng Xiaoping
Franklin Roosevelt
Henry Thomas (as his character Elliott from E.T. the Extra-Terrestrial)
Forrest Gregg

Additional work
Kazurinsky had a small part as a photographer in the 1980 Christopher Reeve/Jane Seymour film Somewhere in Time. At the insistence of his friend John Belushi, he played Pa Greavy in the 1981 Belushi/Aykroyd comedy Neighbors. Shortly after departing Saturday Night Live, Kazurinsky co-wrote About Last Night... based on David Mamet's one act play, Sexual Perversity in Chicago. The film starred Rob Lowe, Demi Moore and Jim Belushi and was directed by Edward Zwick. A remake of About Last Night was released in 2014 starring comedian Kevin Hart. Kazurinsky famously portrayed Officer Carl Sweetchuck in Police Academy 2, 3 and 4.

In the 1990s, Kazurinsky guest starred in Married... with Children, Early Edition and Police Academy: The Series. In the 2000s, Kazurinsky wrote for and guest starred in comedy series such as Curb Your Enthusiasm, What About Joan?, Still Standing and According to Jim. In 2001, he wrote the screenplay for Strange Relations, a film starring Paul Reiser, George Wendt, Julie Walters, and Olympia Dukakis. The screenplay was nominated for a Writers Guild of America Award as well as a BAFTA. Kazurinsky played a supporting role in the 2011 Zombie Army Productions film, The Moleman of Belmont Avenue, which also featured Robert Englund.

As a stage actor, Kazurinsky appeared as Felix in The Odd Couple (opposite George Wendt's Oscar), Wilbur Turnblad in Hairspray, and Peter Quince in William Shakespeare's A Midsummer Night's Dream. Kazurinsky's work in Chicago theatre has been recognized by two Joseph Jefferson Award nominations. In February 2014, Kazurinsky joined the first National Tour of the hit musical Wicked in the role of The Wizard, replacing John Davidson. Kazurinsky finished his run on in March 2015 when the First National Tour closed. In May 2015, Kazurinsky made his Broadway debut alongside Jim Parsons and Christopher Fitzgerald in a limited run of David Javerbaum's new comedy, An Act Of God, directed by Joe Mantello between May and August 2015 at Studio 54.

Kazurinsky and George Wendt reunited during fall of 2015 in the world premiere of Bruce Graham's comedy, Funnyman at Chicago's Northlight Theatre. The production was directed by BJ Jones. In December 2016, Kazurinsky appeared as Frosch the jailer in  Music Theatre Works' production of Johann Strauss II' operetta Die Fledermaus.

Kazurinsky was one of a few people to film Prince's now-legendary impromptu performance of Let's Go Crazy at the SNL40 after party in February 2015. The video went viral following Prince's death in 2016 and was shared by numerous media outlets.

In 2017, Kazurinsky played the recurring role of Judge Emerson on NBC's Chicago Justice, and appeared as Father Timothy in Netflix's original series, Easy.

Personal life
Kazurinsky lives outside Chicago with his wife, Broadway actress Marcia Watkins (On Your Toes, A Chorus Line). Kazurinsky has a daughter, Zoe, and a son, Pete.

Additional filmography

 My Bodyguard (1980) - Workman
 Somewhere in Time (1980) - Photographer, in 1912
 Continental Divide (1981) - Reporter
 Neighbors (1981) - Pa Greavy
 Billions for Boris (1984) - Bart
 This Wife for Hire (1985) - Mel Greenfield, M.D.
 Police Academy 2: Their First Assignment (1985) - Sweetchuck, the Merchant
 Police Academy 3: Back in Training (1986) - Cadet Sweetchuck
 About Last Night (1986) - Colin
 Police Academy 4: Citizens on Patrol (1987) - Officer Sweetchuck
 Hot to Trot (1988) - Leonard
 Wedding Band (1989) - Badger Brother #1
 Shakes the Clown (1991) - 1st Party Dad
 The Cherokee Kid (1996) - Gaudy Hawker
 Plump Fiction (1997) - Priscilla, Queen of the Desserts
 The Silencer (1999) - Librarian
 Poor White Trash (2000) - Carlton Rasmeth
 Handicap Hunters (2001) - Narcoleptic
 Strange Relations (2001) - Attending Nurses
 Betaville (2001) - President XM
 Roll Bounce (2005) - Car Salesman
 8 of Diamonds (2006) - Viggio
 I Want Someone to Eat Cheese With (2006) - Bill Bjango
 Stash (2007) - John Bookenlacher
 Tapioca (2009) - Einstein
 Ca$h (2010) - Chunky Chicken Salesman (uncredited)
 Typing (2010) - Al
 John Belushi: Dancing on the Edge (2010) - Himself
 The Return of Joe Rich (2011) - Petey B
 Close Quarters (2012) - Morris
 Scrooge & Marley (2012) - Marley
 The Moleman of Belmont Avenue (2013) - Harold
Thrill Ride (2016) - Gus
 Chicago Justice (2017) - Judge Emerson
 Alonso, the Dream and the Call (2017) - Store Patron
 Chasing The Blues (2017) - Marvin Pounder
 Easy (2017) - Father Timothy
 Hope Springs Eternal (2018) - Mr. Melvin Baxter
 Vendors (2019) - Wayne

Screenwriting credits
Written with Denise DeClue:
 Big City Comedy (1980)
 About Last Night... (1986)
 For Keeps (1988)
 The Cherokee Kid (1996)
 Relativity (1996)
 Fame L.A. (1997)

Solo work:
 Saturday Night Live (1980-1984)
 Strange Relations (2003)
 According to Jim (2005)

References

External links
Official website

Living people
American male film actors
American male television actors
American television writers
American male television writers
American male voice actors
American people of Polish descent
People from Johnstown, Pennsylvania
Male actors from St. Louis
Male actors from Evanston, Illinois
American sketch comedians
Comedians from Missouri
Comedians from Illinois
American people of Australian descent
Comedians from Pennsylvania
Screenwriters from Illinois
Screenwriters from Pennsylvania
Screenwriters from Missouri
1950 births